Hans Trutz in the Land of Plenty (German: Hans Trutz im Schlaraffenland) is a 1917 German silent fantasy film directed by and starring Paul Wegener and also featuring Lyda Salmonova and Ernst Lubitsch. It was one of a trilogy of fairytale-inspired films made by Wegener, along with Rübezahl's Wedding and The Pied Piper of Hamelin.

It was shot at the Tempelhof Studios in Berlin and on location at Bautzen in Saxony. The film's sets were designed by the art director Rochus Gliese.

Cast
Paul Wegener as Hans Trutz 
Lyda Salmonova as Marthe 
Ernst Lubitsch as Satan 
Wilhelm Diegelmann as Ein Schlaraffe 
Rochus Gliese
Fritz Rasp
Gertrude Welcker as Angel

See also
Cockaigne

References

External links

Films of the German Empire
German silent feature films
Films directed by Paul Wegener
German fantasy films
1910s fantasy films
Films shot at Tempelhof Studios
Films based on fairy tales
German black-and-white films
1910s German films